The Hypocrites is a 1923 British-Dutch silent drama film directed by Charles Giblyn, based on The Hypocrites, a 1906 play by Henry Arthur Jones. The plot concerns the hypocrisy of a squire who tries to make his son deny he fathered a village girl's child, and instead marry an heiress. Jones' play which had already been filmed as The Morals of Weybury (1916) directed by George Loane Tucker with Elisabeth Risdon. The writing credit of this movie goes to Henry Arthur Jones (play) and Eliot Stannard (writer).

Cast
 Wyndham Standing - Rev, Edgar Linnell
 Mary Odette - Rachel Neve
 Lilian Douglas - Helen Plugenet
 Harold French - Lennard Wilmore
 Sidney Paxton - Henry Wilmore
 Roy Travers - Sir John Plugenet
 Bertie White - Aubrey Viveash
 William Hunter - Rev, Everard Daubeney
 Gertrude Sterroll - Mrs. Wilmore
 Vera Hargreave - Mrs. Linnell
 Esther De Boer-van Rijk
 Juliette Roos - (as Juliëtte Roos)
 Carl Tobi
 Evan Shewchuk - Sir Hypocrite McLiar

References

External links 
 

1923 films
Dutch silent feature films
British black-and-white films
Dutch black-and-white films
1923 drama films
Films directed by Charles Giblyn
British drama films
British silent feature films
1920s British films
Silent drama films